Qadrius salvus is a species of beetle in the family Aderidae.

References

Aderidae
Beetles described in 1964